Ara Torosyan (born May 10, 1972), known in the Armenian music industry by his pen name Murzo, is a music arranger and record producer. He is widely recognized to be one of the best music arrangers in his native country of Armenia. Torosyan arranged music and produced records for Andre, Tata Simonyan, Eva Rivas, as well as Armenian folk music stars Inga and Anush Arshakyans. He is a permanent member of the jury panel for the hit music television show Two Stars aired on Armenia 1 сhannel. Torosyan arranged and produced Eva Rivas's song Apricot Stone, which was the Armenian entry for the Eurovision Song Contest 2010 held in Oslo, Norway.

Awards 
Ara Torosyan received the following national  awards in Armenia:
 2010 Tashir Music Award in the Best Musical Producer of the Year Category
 2008 Voske Qnar recognizing his "Contributions to the Popularization of the Armenian National Music"
 2007 Armenian Music Award (USA) for The Best Instrumental Album category
 2004 Armenia National Music Award in the Best Arranger of the Year Category
 2001 Sayat-Nova National Contest
 2001 Krounk Award in the Best Arranger of the Year Category
 1993 Asoup in the Best Arranger of the Year Category

Film Credits 
Torosyan arranged music and produced soundtracks for the following feature and documentary films:
 Documentary Film From Ararat to Zion, a film directed by Edgar Baghdasaryan, and narrated by Aidan Quinn.
 Feature Film Yerevan Jan, directed by Michael Poghosyan
 Feature Film Unwritten Law, directed by Gor Vadanyan
 Feature Film Yerevan Blues, directed by Michael Poghosyan
 Feature Film Mariam, directed by Edgar Baghdasaryan
 Documentary Film The Land of Holy Rites, directed by Edgar Baghdasaryan

Education 
Ara Torosyan is a graduate of the Yerevan Komitas State Conservatory.

References 

1972 births
Musicians from Yerevan
Living people
Armenian record producers
Place of birth missing (living people)
Tchaikovsky Secondary Music School alumni